Vasilios Sakellarakis (2 April 1933 – 14 March 2018) was a Greek athlete. He competed in the men's triple jump at the 1952 Summer Olympics.

References

External links
 

1933 births
2018 deaths
Athletes (track and field) at the 1952 Summer Olympics
Greek male triple jumpers
Olympic athletes of Greece
Athletes from Athens